The Ridge & Valley Conference is a Wisconsin Interscholastic Athletic Association (WIAA) conference currently consisting of eight members located in southwestern Wisconsin.

Members

The current members of the Ridge & Valley Conference are:

See also
List of high school athletic conferences in Wisconsin
Wisconsin Interscholastic Athletic Association

References
Ridge & Valley Conference
Ridge & Valley Conference Facebook page
Wisconsin Interscholastic Athletic Association homepage
DeSoto Area School District
Ithaca School District
Kickapoo Area School District
La Farge School District
North Crawford School District
Seneca School District
Wauzeka-Steuben School District
Weston School District

Wisconsin high school sports conferences
High school sports conferences and leagues in the United States